In enzymology, a UDP-N-acetylmuramoyl-L-alanyl-D-glutamate—L-lysine ligase is an enzyme that catalyzes the chemical reaction

ATP + UDP-N-acetylmuramoyl-L-alanyl-D-glutamate + L-lysine  ADP + phosphate + UDP-N-acetylmuramoyl-L-alanyl-D-glutamyl-L-lysine

The 3 substrates of this enzyme are ATP, UDP-N-acetylmuramoyl-L-alanyl-D-glutamate, and L-lysine, whereas its 3 products are ADP, phosphate, and UDP-N-acetylmuramoyl-L-alanyl-D-glutamyl-L-lysine.

This enzyme belongs to the family of ligases, specifically those forming carbon-nitrogen bonds as acid-D-amino-acid ligases (peptide synthases).  The systematic name of this enzyme class is UDP-N-acetylmuramoyl-L-alanyl-D-glutamate:L-lysine gamma-ligase (ADP-forming). Other names in common use include MurE synthetase, UDP-N-acetylmuramoyl-L-alanyl-D-glutamyl-L-lysine synthetase, uridine diphospho-N-acetylmuramoylalanyl-D-glutamyllysine, synthetase, and UPD-MurNAc-L-Ala-D-Glu:L-Lys ligase.  This enzyme participates in peptidoglycan biosynthesis.

References 

 
 

EC 6.3.2
Enzymes of unknown structure